The final of the Men's 200 metres Individual Medley event at the European LC Championships 1997 was held in Sunday 24 August 1997 in Seville, Spain.

Finals

Qualifying heats

Remarks

See also
1997 Men's World Championships (SC) 200m Individual Medley

References
 scmsom results
La Gazzetta Archivio
swimrankings

M